Nile is an American death metal band from Greenville, South Carolina, formed in 1993. The band's current lineup consists of founding member Karl Sanders (guitars, vocals), George Kollias (drums), and Brian Kingsland (guitars, vocals). The band is known for their dedicated lyrical and musical styles inspired by Egyptology and works of H. P. Lovecraft. Since its formation, the band has released nine studio albums, two compilations, three extended plays, two demos, three singles, and five music videos. Their latest studio album, Vile Nilotic Rites, was released on November 1, 2019, through Nuclear Blast.

History

1990s
Nile formed in Greenville, South Carolina in 1993 from a previous band called Morriah, in which founding member Karl Sanders performed in since the 1980s. The name of this band was taken from the Nile river. Nile released a self-titled thrash-influenced demo in 1994 (re-issued in 2011 under the title Worship the Animal - 1994: The Lost Recordings). Sanders, vocalist/bassist Chief Spires and drummer Pete Hammoura released the Festivals of Atonement EP in 1995, leading Nile to a southwestern tour in support of other metal acts such as Obituary, Deicide, and Broken Hope.

The EP Ramses Bringer of War was released by Visceral Productions in 1997. The label was due to release the band's first full-length album Amongst the Catacombs of Nephren-Ka, but went out of business later that year. However, Relapse Records was open to releasing it early on, giving Nile a wider distribution and a chance to tour with Incantation and Morbid Angel.

2000s

The follow-up, Black Seeds of Vengeance, was released in September 2000. Prior to the release, drummer Pete Hammoura left the band due to injuries sustained while touring with Catacomb. Derek Roddy stepped in as a session musician to perform on all of the tracks (except "To Dream of Ur"). Also, prior to the album, Dallas Toler-Wade joined as a second guitarist/vocalist. Chief Spires left the band a few months after the release of Black Seeds of Vengeance, citing personal and professional differences. He was replaced by Jon Vesano. The band also found new drummer Tony Laureano.

In 2002, In Their Darkened Shrines was released. One reviewer noted that the album gave "death metal a cinematic, symphonic twist". Two videos were shot with director Darren Doane, "Sarcophagus" and "Execration Text", respectively.

The follow-up album Annihilation of the Wicked was released in 2005. Greek drummer George Kollias stepped in to replace Laureano, who left before the recording sessions began. After recording the bass parts for the album, Jon Vesano also left the band. He was temporarily replaced by Joe Payne on the following tour. Another Darren Doane directed video was shot for the song "Sacrifice Unto Sebek".

In May 2006, Nile signed a recording contract with Nuclear Blast. On February 26, 2007, Nile entered the studio and began recording their fifth full-length album entitled Ithyphallic, which was their first release with the label. Karl Sanders had confirmed a release date of June 29, 2007, via a posting on the band's message board, which was later pushed back to July 20, 2007. As a special bonus, Nuclear Blast gave several fans the opportunity to listen to the new album two weeks before its release if they could decipher a hieroglyphic message, to which "papyrus" was the answer. Upon the album's release, it sold 4,600 copies, which enabled Nile to get onto the Billboard 200 for the first time, reaching No. 162 on that chart.

On March 21, 2007, Nile was confirmed as a "Second Stage" act for Ozzfest 2007. A message from Karl Sanders via Nile's MySpace profile indicated that they were excited to finally bring true death metal to an Ozzfest audience. From March to April 2008, Nile went on a headlining tour in the United States with Suicide Silence, The Faceless, Unexpect, and Warbringer. From September to October 2008, Nile set out on a European headlining tour with Grave, Omnium Gatherum and Severe Torture. In October 2008, the band planned to take their Ithyphallic tour to South Africa for a booking of three shows, but were canceled for unknown reasons.

In June 2009, Nile entered the recording studio to begin work on their sixth full-length album entitled Those Whom the Gods Detest. The album was released on November 3, 2009, and was critically well-received, with one reviewer suggesting "pretty much the only thing standing in Nile's way at this point is the fact that we as listeners have become so accustomed to the band's excellence that another excellent album seems almost par for the course".

2010s

On October 21, 2010, bassist Chris Lollis was confirmed as the new member for Nile, after four years of session work with the band. On December 6, 2011, Nile announced work in progress, and the completion of drum tracking, for their upcoming album in 2012.

On February 4, 2012, Karl Sanders announced on his Facebook page that they had a new bassist, Todd Ellis, who would contribute vocals to the new record. The next day, he explained on the band's official forum that he had lost contact with Chris Lollis during the writing and recording of the upcoming album, and after three months of silence from him they hired a replacement. The seventh album At the Gate of Sethu was released on June 29, 2012.

On February 9, 2015, Todd Ellis left the band, citing "unforeseen circumstances beyond my control". Nile's eighth studio album What Should Not Be Unearthed was released on August 28, 2015.

In the summer of 2016, the band took part in the Summer Slaughter tour. 

In October 2016, after the Summer Slaughter tour, Dallas Toler-Wade left the band, prioritizing his duties with Narcotic Wasteland, and was replaced by Enthean vocalist/guitarist Brian Kingsland. Nile made the announcement in February 2017,  In May 2017, the band entered the studio to begin work on their ninth album Vile Nilotic Rites, which was released on November 1, 2019.

2020s
In July 2022, Sanders confirmed to Guitar World magazine that Nile has been working on their tenth studio album: "So far, we've got 10 songs written. We're probably going to do three more, and hopefully start recording by the end of the summer. Then we've got a European tour coming up in November/December, and after that, we've got to finish the record and hopefully get it out sometime early next year."

In October 2022 Nile announced Julian Guillen would be joining the band on bass for the upcoming November/December European tour.

Musical style and lyrical themes
The majority of Nile's music is written by vocalist/guitarist Karl Sanders. It combines traditional and technical death metal. Nile's music is characterized by the technical death metal genre's comparative complexity and speed combined with a riffing style consistent with brutal death metal. Nile's guitar and bass tunings are typically dropped A tuning.

Much of the lyrical content is based on Sanders' interest in Egyptology (mainly inspired by Ancient Egyptian and Near Eastern mysticism, history, religion, and ancient art) and other ancient Middle Eastern cultures, such as Mesopotamia. Works of H.P. Lovecraft also seems to have an enduring influence upon the band's lyrical themes; the word "Nile" and the title of the band's first full-length album ("Amongst the Catacombs of Nephren-Ka") can both be found in the same sentence of Lovecraft's short story The Outsider. Extensive sleeve notes are included on all Nile's full-length releases from Black Seeds of Vengeance onwards, with the exception of Ithyphallic, explaining the inspiration or source for the lyrics of each song.

Band members

Current members
Karl Sanders – guitars (1993–present), vocals, keyboards (1995–present)
George Kollias – drums (2004–present)
Brian Kingsland – guitars, vocals (2017–present)

Former members
Chief Spires – bass, vocals (1993–2001)
Pete Hammoura – drums, vocals (1993–2000)
John Ehlers – guitars (1996–1997)
Dallas Toler-Wade – guitars, vocals (1997–2016)
Tony Laureano – drums (2000–2004)
Jon Vesano – bass, vocals (2001–2005)
Chris Lollis – bass, vocals (2007–2012)
Todd Ellis – bass, vocals (2012–2015)
Brad Parris – bass, vocals (2015–2022)

Session musicians
Derek Roddy – drums (2000)

Live musicians
Tim Yeung – drums (2003)
Joe Payne – bass, vocals (2005–2007, died 2020)
Steve Tucker – bass, vocals (2005)
Scott Eames – guitars, vocals (2022–present)
Julian David Guillen - bass, vocals (2022-present)

Timeline

Discography 

Studio albums
Amongst the Catacombs of Nephren-Ka (1998)
Black Seeds of Vengeance (2000)
In Their Darkened Shrines (2002)
Annihilation of the Wicked (2005)
Ithyphallic (2007)
Those Whom the Gods Detest (2009)
At the Gate of Sethu (2012)
What Should Not Be Unearthed (2015)
Vile Nilotic Rites (2019)

References

External links

1993 establishments in South Carolina
American death metal musical groups
American technical death metal musical groups
Egyptian mythology in music
Heavy metal musical groups from South Carolina
Musical groups established in 1993
Musical groups from South Carolina
Musical quartets
Napalm Records artists